Youth is a 1922 German silent film directed by Fred Sauer and starring Grete Reinwald, Fritz Schulz and Fritz Rasp.

Cast
 Grete Reinwald as Anna
 Fritz Schulz as Hans Hartwig
 Heinz Salfner as Pastor Hoppe
 Theodor Loos as Kapellan Schigorski
 Ilka Grüning
 Fritz Rasp as Amandus
 Herbert Stock as Burgermeister Hartwig
 Ida Perry as Frau Burgermeister
 Alfred Schmasow
 Rolf Jäger
 Käthe Haack
 Jori Sarno
 Ernst Pröckl

References

Bibliography
 Alfred Krautz. International directory of cinematographers, set- and costume designers in film, Volume 4. Saur, 1984.
 Goble, Alan. The Complete Index to Literary Sources in Film. Walter de Gruyter, 1999.

External links
 

1922 films
Films of the Weimar Republic
German silent feature films
Films directed by Fred Sauer
German black-and-white films
German films based on plays
1920s German films